Khanda Kheri is a village in Hansi Tehsil, Hisar District in the Indian state of Haryana.

Education
The Govt Girls School was established in 1901.

Geography

Demography
According to the 2011 census, the population was 7,719, including 4,190 males and 3,529 females in 1,496 households. The literacy rate is 99.5%.

Notables

 Abhimanyu Sindhu,Ex Cabinet Minister, director of Sindhu Education Foundation, editor-founder of Hari Bhoomi
 K. K. Sindhu, DG of Haryana police academy Madhuban.
 Ch. Sarup Singh
- a former minister of Excise and Taxation, Development and Cooperation, Haryana; and a former Speaker of Haryana
 Vidhan Sabha, was a politician of Haryana.
 Prof. JAGAT SINGH CHAUHAN(Lohan)
Founder of.
Handball Federation of India,
Throwball Federation of India,
Netball Federation of India,
Attended Munich Olympics.
 Sh.Jaswant Singh former minister of Haryana.
 Sh. Amar singh former minister of Haryana.
 Azad Singh Khanda Kheri Ragni gayak or folk singer from Haryana

References 

Villages in Hisar district